The Stanford Chaparral (also known as the Chappie) is a humor magazine published by students of Stanford University since 1899.

History
The Stanford Chaparral was established in 1899 by Bristow Adams. Published for more than 112 years, the Chappie is the third oldest continually published humor magazine in the world after Nebelspalter (1875–present) and the Harvard Lampoon (1876–present). The magazine's most recent brush with the national media was its feature in The New Yorker by Evan Ratliff.

Traditions
The Chappie is published six times during the academic year, or twice per quarter. There are a number of traditional issues, such as the Freshman Number published at the beginning of the school year, and the Big Game Number published on the week of the longstanding football matchup between Stanford and The University of California, Berkeley. In the early Spring, the Chaparral traditionally publishes an annual satire of The Stanford Daily, popularly termed the "Fake Daily."

During the annual elections for student government, two of the magazine's writers traditionally run for president and vice-president of the student body. Despite running as a joke, candidates have won the executive race in the past.

Chaparral alumni
In addition to Adams, the magazine has a number of prominent alumni, including cartoonist Chris Onstad, creator of the webcomic Achewood, The Simpsons Executive Producer Josh Weinstein, National Medal of Science recipient Bradley Efron, Louis Padulo, President of the University of Alabama in Huntsville, novelist Trey Ellis, author and attorney Daniel Olivas, Bruce Handy, Editor of Vanity Fair and Spy Magazine, Goodwin Knight, Governor of the State of California, comedian Doodles Weaver, legendary Disney animators Frank Thomas and Ollie Johnston, Disney writer/director/producer James Algar, actor Frank Cady (Sam Drucker on Green Acres) and nerdcore rapper MC Lars (Andrew Nielsen).

Old Boys
The magazine's editor-in-chief is termed the "Old Boy," a tradition reaching back to the earliest Chappie numbers. The Old Boys in recent years are as follows:

 2020-2021: Nicholas Midler
 2019-2020: Pete Tellouche
 2018-2019: Samantha Kargilis and Scott Mutchnik
 2017-2018: Samantha Kargilis and Scott Mutchnik
 2016-1017: Scott Mutchnik and Tristan Navarro
 2015-2016: "Mama Cosmos" Cassidy Elwood and Mason Stricklin
 2014-2015: R. Garrett Taylor and "Mama Cass" Cassidy Elwood
 2013-2014: Michael Ryan De Taboada and Anthony Veasna So
 2012-2013: Kian V. Ameli
 2011-2012: Samuel Coggeshall and Alex Hertz
 2010-2011: William Kemper and Josh Meisel

Circulation
The Chaparral is nationally distributed.

See also 

 The Stanford Flipside
 Will Irwin
 The Stanford Daily

References

External links
 Stanford Chaparral (official site)
 New Yorker article

Satirical magazines published in the United States
College humor magazines
Humor magazines
Magazines established in 1899
Magazines published in California
Chappie
Student magazines published in the United States